The following is the qualification system and list of qualified nations for the Equestrian at the 2019 Pan American Games competition.

Qualification system
A quota of 150 equestrian riders (48 dressage, 48 eventing and 54 show jumping) will be allowed to qualify. A maximum of 12 athletes can compete for a nation across all events (with a maximum of four per discipline). Athletes qualified through various qualifying events and rankings.

If a country does not qualify a team in eventing, it may enter a maximum of two individuals per discipline. A team can be made up of three of four athletes, meaning if reallocation does occur, countries with individuals can qualify teams, respecting the maximum number of teams allowed to compete in each discipline.

Qualification summary
A total of 21 NOC's qualified athletes.

Qualification timeline

Dressage
A total of ten teams of 4 (or 3) athletes each will qualify, along with 8 individuals who will qualify for a total of 48 athletes.

Team

The Dominican Republic and Colombia only entered a team of three athletes at the 2018 Central American and Caribbean Games.

Individual

Only four nations took part in the South American Qualifier. As three countries qualified teams to the Pan Am Games, only Uruguay qualified the limit of two individual athletes. The last spot was vacant and will be distributed by the FEI World Eventing Ranking.

Eventing
A total of ten teams of 4 (or 3) athletes each will qualify, along with 8 individuals will qualify for a total of 48 athletes.

Team

Individual

Only four nations took part in the South American Qualifier. As three countries qualified teams to the Pan Am Games, only Uruguay qualified the limit of two individual athletes. Uruguay has later reallocated a team quota, meaning zero individual quotas were awarded at the South American Qualifier.
Colombia's quotas were reallocated as the country later qualified a team.
One spot remains open

Jumping
A total of 12 teams of 4 (or 3) athletes each will qualify, along with 6 individuals will qualify for a total of 54 athletes.

Team

Individual

Venezuela qualified a team, and its two individual quotas were reallocated.

References

P
P
Qualification for the 2019 Pan American Games
Equestrian at the 2019 Pan American Games